Lodderena tanae is a species of sea snail, a marine gastropod mollusk in the family Skeneidae.

Distribution
This species occurs in the Arabian Sea off Oman.

References

External links
 To World Register of Marine Species

tanae
Gastropods described in 1996